John E. Scheaffer (August 28, 1916 – March 29, 1990) is a former Republican member of the Pennsylvania House of Representatives.

References

Republican Party members of the Pennsylvania House of Representatives
1990 deaths
1916 births
20th-century American politicians